Pseudopostega parakempella is a moth of the family Opostegidae. It was described by Donald R. Davis and Jonas R. Stonis, 2007. It is known from southern Florida and the Oaxaca Region in Mexico.

The length of the forewings is 2.1–2.4 mm. Adults have been recorded from November to January.

Etymology
The specific name is derived from the Greek para (meaning near, beside) prefixed to the name of the species Pseudopostega kempella with which this species has been confused.

References

Opostegidae
Moths described in 2007